Algeria is an unincorporated community in Pleasants County, West Virginia, United States.  The village is located along Big Run, a branch of Middle Island Creek, where County Route 7, Arvilla Road, meets Desert Road, about two miles above and southeast of Arvilla.  A U.S. Post Office was established there in 1894, and continued to 1910, when the post office was discontinued, and the mail redirected to Wasp.

References 

Unincorporated communities in West Virginia
Unincorporated communities in Pleasants County, West Virginia